= Alexander Kartozia =

Georgian politician and academic

Alexander Kartozia (born 1959), also Alexandre, (ალექსანდრე გურამის ძე კარტოზია) is a scholar, politician and diplomat from the country of Georgia. In September 2025, he was appointed as Georgia's ambassador to Germany. Kartozia previously served as Minister of Education under the government of President Eduard Shevardnadze, from 1998-2003.

By training and background, Kartozia is a philologist and specialist in German language, with a significant range of activity in the field. From 1989, he was the head of department of German philology at Tbilisi State University. From 1997-1998 he searved as the head of the National Library of Georgia. Under his tenure as Minister of Education there were several attempts of reform to reduce corruption. After leaving government, Kartozia worked at universities in Germany, mainly the Viadrina University. He is the recipient of various fellowships.

In 2022, Kartozia was awarded the Order of Merit (Bundesverdienstkreuz) of the Federal Republic of Germany. In his earlier career he had worked as a German language teacher, been involved in setting up a German-oriented school in Tbilisi, and researched questions of translation. He studied in Tbilisi and at the Humboldt-University of Berlin (1977–1979).

Kartozia has published on translation and interpretation, and also published an anthology of descriptions of Tbilisi, with the Suhrkamp Verlag in 2018.

== Selected Publications ==
- A. Kartosia/E. Schreiber (Hrsg.), Zug nach Tbilissi. Ein Lesebuch. Suhrkamp Verlag Frankfurt a. M. 2018,
- A. Kartosia, Nachwort. In: Grigol Robakidse, Die gemordete Seele. Roman (Hrsg. von A. Kartosia). Arco Verlag Wuppertal/Wien 2018, S. 213-254.
- A. Kartosia, Nachwort. In: Grigol Robakidse, Kaukasische Novellen (Hrsg. von A. Kartosia). Arco Verlag Wuppertal/Wien 2018, S. 101-128.
- A. Kartosia, Ein Mann der Gegensätze. In: Begleitbuch zu Guram Dotschanaschwilis Roman Das erste Gewand. Hanser Verlag München 2018, S. 19-23.
